Miguel Verdiguier (1706 – 29 December 1796) was a French sculptor who spent much of his career in Spain.

Biography

Miguel Verdiguier was born in Marseille in 1706.
He became a director of the Marseille Academy of Statutory, and later became an academic of merit at the San Fernando Academy of Fine Arts in Madrid.

In 1765 the Cathedral Chapter of Córdoba commissioned him to construct a monument to the Archangel San Rafael next to the Puerta del Puente. 
He also made Churrigueresque pulpits for the Cordoba Cathedral, and the Museum of Fine Arts of Cordoba also preserves some of his work.
He made all the outdoor sculptures for the facade of the Sanctuary of the Cathedral of Jaen.
In 1780, working with his son, he made the reliefs of the facade of the chapel of S. Cecilio for the Granada Cathedral in 1780.
He made a sculpture of the Entombment of Christ for the city of Lucena.
Verdiguier died in Cordoba in 1796.

One of his pupils, José Álvarez Cubero (23 April 1768 - 26 November 1827), became famous for his works in the neoclassical style.

Gallery

References

1706 births
1796 deaths
18th-century French sculptors
French male sculptors
18th-century French male artists